"Anticipation" is a song written and performed by Carly Simon, and the lead single from her 1971 album of the same name. The song peaked at No. 13 on the Billboard pop singles chart and at No. 3 on the Billboard Adult Contemporary chart. The song also ranked No. 72 on Billboards Year-End Hot 100 singles of 1972, and garnered Simon a Grammy Award nomination for Best Pop Female Vocalist. Simon wrote the song on the guitar in 15 minutes, as she awaited Cat Stevens to pick her up for a date.

"Anticipation" is one of Simon's biggest hits. It has been included on several compilations of her work, including The Best of Carly Simon (1975), Clouds in My Coffee (1995), The Very Best of Carly Simon: Nobody Does It Better (1999), Anthology (2002), and Reflections: Carly Simon's Greatest Hits (2004). A live version from her 1988 album Greatest Hits Live was included on Sony BMG/Legacy's 2014 compilation release Playlist: The Very Best of Carly Simon.

The song was used in commercials for Heinz Ketchup through the late 1970s into the 1980s. Saturday Night Live used the song in a similar fashion for its mock commercial for "Swill Mineral Water."

In 2018, it was also used in a teaser advertisement for the ABC series The Conners.

Critical reception
Stephen Davis, writing for Rolling Stone, stated "Anticipation is a spirited examination of the tensions involved in a burgeoning romantic situation in which nobody has any idea of what's going on or what's going to happen." He continued "Carly's fine, aggressive vocal is complemented by Paul Glanz' lyrical piano comping, and drummer Andy Newmark's rhythms are to the point. The cut winds up with a surprising coda crescendo that pithily wraps up the premise of the message about anticipating things to come–Stay right here, 'cause these are the good old days".

AllMusic reviewer Joe Viglione said of the track, "In retrospect the song (and the album) are among Carly's finest." And concluded "'Anticipation' was more than a great melody and performance, it became a pivotal bridge and foundation for fifteen years of hits."

Track listing
7" single
 "Anticipation" – 3:19
 "The Garden" – 4:08

Charts

Weekly charts

Year-end charts

References

External links
 Carly Simon's official website
 

1971 singles
Carly Simon songs
Songs written by Carly Simon
Song recordings produced by Paul Samwell-Smith
1971 songs